Sila-e-Mohabbat is a 2021 Pakistani drama television series, produced by MD Productions. It stars Rabab Hashim, Noor Hassan Rizvi and Momina Iqbal in lead roles. It first aired on 11 October 2021 on Hum TV.

Cast 
 Rabab Hashim as Alizeh
 Noor Hassan Rizvi as Tabrez
 Momina Iqbal as Rania
 Ali Safina as Raheel
 Arslan Asad Butt as Ahmer
 Waseem Abbas as Tabrez's father
 Shaheen Khan as Tabrez's mother
 Dania Enwer as Shreena
 Hassan Nizai as Anwar
 Agha Mustafa Hassan as Shahmeer
 Ayesha Mirza
 Farhan Ally Agha as Alizeh's father

Production 
The drama series is produced by Momina Duraid Productions. It is directed by Adeel Siddiqui, director of 2020 drama Dulhan and written by Nadia Ahmed who previously wrote comedy serial Terha Aangan.

Sila-e-Mohabbat is the third on-screen appearance of the lead couple Hashim and Rizvi after Amanat and Ishq Na Kariyo Koi.

References

Pakistani drama television series
2021 Pakistani television series debuts
Television series by MD Productions
Hum TV
2020s drama television series